William Frazer may refer to:

Willie Frazer (1960–2019),  Loyalist campaigner from Northern Ireland 
William Frazer (sport shooter) (1884–1963), United States sportsman
William C. Frazer (1776–1836), United States territorial judge
William Frazer (Australian politician) for Electoral district of Creswick

See also
William Fraser (disambiguation)
Willie Frazier, American football player
Frazer Will, Canadian athlete